The tarot refers to a pack of playing cards used from the mid-15th century to play games and, later, also for cartomantic packs of cards used for divination.

Tarot may also refer to:
 Tarot card reading, a form of cartomancy
 Tarot card games, games played with Tarot decks, also known as Tarock decks
 French Tarot, a trick-taking card game

Comics
 Tarot (comics), Marvel Comics character
 Tarot: Witch of the Black Rose, American comic book
 The Tarot Café, series of manhwa comics by Sang-Sun Park

Music
 Tarot (album), album by heavy metal band Dark Moor
 Tarot (band), heavy metal band from Finland
 Tarot, LP from Walter Wegmüller
 "Tarot", a song by Bad Bunny and Jhay Cortez from the 2022 album Un Verano Sin Ti

Film and television
 Tarot, lead character in the television series Ace of Wands
 Tarot, 1973 film directed by José María Forqué
 Tarot (1986 film), German film
 Tarot (2009 film)

Other uses
 Tarout Island, an island in the Persian Gulf belonging to the Eastern Province of Saudi Arabia
 Tarot series, a trilogy of novels by Piers Anthony
 T.A.R.O.T., a fictional international criminal network in the James Bond 007 role-playing game